Stoke Charity is a small village on the River Dever that lies within the Wonston (where the 2011 Census was included) civil parish in the City of Winchester district of Hampshire, England. Its nearest town is Winchester, which lies approximately 6.1 miles (9.9 km) south-west from the village.

In past centuries, the manor was also known as Old Stoke, still remembered in the street name "Old Stoke Road".

History
Stoke Charity is mentioned in the Domesday Book of 1086, where it appears as Stoches. It appears as Stokecharite circa 1270. It was held by Henry de la Charite in the thirteenth century, so 'Charity' is thus a family name.

In 904, Edward the Elder probably granted the area of the present parish to Hyde Abbey as part of the manor of Micheldever. The Church of England parish church of St Mary and St Michael dates mainly from the 12th and 13th centuries. According to the church's guidebook, the Norman nave and chancel may have been added to a small Saxon church to form the north aisle of an enlarged church. The church stands in a field just to the east of the village.

Stoke Charity also had a manor house and home farm, which employed most of the population as farm labourers up until the late 19th century. Watercress beds were well developed and numerous in Stoke Charity until recently. These were fed by the River Dever, which is a tributary of the River Test. Some watercress beds have been brought back into use as of 2020

References

External links

Villages in Hampshire